Alfred Peik Christensen (born May 14, 1952) is a Norwegian alpine ski racer. Born in Oslo, he competed at the 1972 Winter Olympics in Sapporo, Japan, in all three alpine events: slalom, giant slalom, and downhill.

Christensen was the Norwegian champion in giant slalom at age seventeen in 1970 and again in 1972. While racing for the University of Denver, he won four individual NCAA titles, in slalom (1973, 1975) and alpine combined (1973, 1974).

Olympic results

References

1952 births
Living people
Alpine skiers from Oslo
Norwegian male alpine skiers
Olympic alpine skiers of Norway
Alpine skiers at the 1972 Winter Olympics